Once Upon a Wheel is a 1971 ABC television documentary on the history of auto racing.  It was hosted by Paul Newman and was directed and produced by David Winters.

A racing enthusiast, Newman narrated this hour-long documentary on the history of auto racing.    Joining Newman was Mario Andretti, Kirk Douglas, Hugh Downs, Dean Martin, Cesar Romero, Dick Smothers and many others.

TV Guide featured an article on the program as well as Newman on the cover in the April 17, 1971 issue.  The film was released to home video by Monterey Media.

Sponsors 
Coca-Cola bottlers sponsored the show, and Mr. Newman appeared in magazine ads (wearing a Coke racing jacket). Viewers could order special collectibles related to the show: 8-track cartridges or cassette tapes of music from the show (featuring a previously unreleased title song, written for the film by The Association, amongst the 13 featured tracks), a cooler which held Cokes and ice, a Coca-Cola jacket similar to Newman's, and racing jacket style patches.

International 
The show was released theatrically in Europe, with additional footage.  The Italian title was "I Giganti del  Brivido", and "Vertigo Sobre Ruedas" in Spanish.  The director, David Winters has stated it was Paul Newman's impression of the finished product that encouraged the extended version.

Reviews 

"Spectacular ... Paul Newman and celebs performed for director David Winters with joie de la cause, abetted by extraordinary editing. ... A poetic study of man and machines ... Incredible effect ... Most exciting."
-Hollywood Reporter

(see )

Further reading 
 Ormstein, Bill, "Winters-Rosen Triple Budgets", The Hollywood Reporter,17, Nov, 1970: p1

See also
 List of American films of 1971

References

External links

Home video listing on commercial website 
 Overview on New York Times Website
 

Motorsport in the United States
1970s American television specials
American Broadcasting Company television specials
American documentary television films
Promotional campaigns by Coca-Cola
American auto racing films
Documentary films about auto racing
1971 films
1971 television specials
1971 in American television
Films directed by David Winters
1970s American films